Klax is a puzzle video game released in arcades in 1990 by Atari Games while Namco distributed the game in Japanese markets. It was designed by Dave Akers and Mark Stephen Pierce. The object is to catch colored blocks tumbling down a machine and arrange them in colored rows and patterns to make them disappear. Klax was originally published as a coin-op follow-up to Tetris, about which Atari Games was in a legal dispute at the time.

The Atari 2600 version, released in mid 1990, and Fatal Run, are the final releases for the console which was discontinued in early 1992.

Gameplay

Controls consist of a four-position joystick and a button. The player controls a small paddle at the lower end of a constantly running conveyor belt. Using the joystick, the player can move the paddle left or right to catch tiles in various colors as they advance down the conveyor. Below the paddle is a well that can hold up to 25 tiles in five columns of five; pressing the button causes the topmost tile on the paddle to fall directly downward and into the well, as long as that column is not full. The goal is to form "Klaxes," or unbroken horizontal/vertical/diagonal lines containing three tiles of the same color. Doing so awards points and causes those tiles to disappear, allowing any tiles above them to fall toward the bottom of the well. Bonus points are awarded for completing multiple Klaxes with a single tile (including lines of four or five matching tiles) and for Klaxes formed by the falling of already-placed tiles.

The paddle can hold up to five tiles at any given moment. The player is penalized with one "drop" whenever a tile falls off the conveyor without being caught or while the paddle is full. Pushing up on the joystick will flip the topmost tile on the paddle a short distance up the conveyor, while pulling down accelerates the motion of the tiles.

The game consists of 100 waves, presented as 20 groups of five waves each. At the start of the game and after every fifth wave, the drop meter is cleared and the player is presented with three options of which wave to play next; choosing a later wave awards bonus points and allows more drops. Each wave has an objective that must be reached, such as making a set number of Klaxes, scoring a certain number of points, or surviving a set number of tiles. At the end of a wave, bonus points are awarded for each tile still on the conveyor and paddle and for each empty space in the well. 

The game ends when the player either exhausts the available drops, completely fills the well, or finishes all 100 waves.

Development
Akers programmed Klax in just a few weeks using AmigaBASIC, then ported each line to C. In a 1990 interview, he said he wanted to "produce something playable, compact and relatively quick to develop". His influences were Tetris and tic-tac-toe. He chose the name from the sound tiles make rolling across the screen. Atari Games released Klax in February 1990, with Namco releasing the game in Japan a few months later, and soon called it a "major arcade hit". It quickly released several home versions under the Tengen brand. Akers created the Nintendo Entertainment System and Genesis editions. Some 16-bit conversions feature improved graphics. Klax received the Parents' Choice Foundation's seal of approval in 1990, won Best Mind Game at the 1991 European Computer Leisure Awards, and Dennis Lynch of the Chicago Tribune named Klax the Best Cartridge of 1990.

Midway Games gained the rights to Klax upon purchasing Atari Games in 1996. The game has been re-released in retro compilations for modern consoles. A 1999 press release called it Midway's "tic-tac tile puzzle game". Mike Mika, who was working on the Game Boy Color version of the game, placed a hidden wedding proposal inside it. It took his then girlfriend three years to uncover the proposal. Mike Mika also inserted a hidden Snake-like game and a mini-adventure game as easter eggs.

After the arcade version, Klax was converted to most contemporary home computers and video game systems of the 1990s, including the Atari Lynx, Amstrad GX4000, and the Atari 2600 as its final official Atari-licensed release exclusively in Europe. Klax is the first game with versions for all three of the leading 1990s consoles: the Nintendo Entertainment System, the Genesis, and the TurboGrafx-16. Klax was included in Arcade Party Pak for the PlayStation. It was reissued in Midway Arcade Treasures, a 2003 compilation for the GameCube, PlayStation 2, Xbox, and PC. It appears in Lego Dimensions.

Reception
In Japan, Game Machine listed Klax in its April 1, 1990 issue as being the seventh most-successful table arcade unit of the year.

On release, Famicom Tsūshin awarded the PC Engine version 30 out of 40. Klax was ranked the 26th best game of all time by Amiga Power in 1991. The NES version is ranked 44 in IGNs Top 100 NES Games.  

In a capsule review of the Lynx version for STart, Clayton Walnum commented, "Once you start playing Klax, a maniac with an Uzi won't be able to tear you away. Not only are the graphics clean and vivid, the music is darn near good enough to dance to and the digitized sound effects and speech are astonishing for such a small unit." Julian Rignall reviewed the Atari Lynx version for CVG Magazine in January 1991, saying "the game is simple, but very, very addictive" and giving a rating of 93 out of 100.

References

External links

1990 video games
Amiga games
Amstrad CPC games
Arcade video games
Atari 2600 games
Atari 5200 games
Atari arcade games
Atari Lynx games
Atari ST games
BBC Micro and Acorn Electron games
Cancelled Atari 7800 games
Commodore 64 games
Domark games
Falling block puzzle games
Game Boy Color games
Game Boy games
ICE Software games
MSX games
NEC PC-8801 games
NEC PC-9801 games
Midway video games
Nintendo Entertainment System games
SAM Coupé games
Master System games
Game Gear games
Sega Genesis games
X68000 games
Tengen (company) games
Unauthorized video games
TurboGrafx-16 games
Video games developed in the United States
Video games scored by Alex Rudis
Video games scored by Brad Fuller
Video games scored by Matt Furniss
ZX Spectrum games
Multiplayer and single-player video games